The 1949–50 season was the first and only edition of the Israeli League. It was the first season after independence in 1948, and the eleventh season of league football in what had been Mandatory Palestine. The season started on 28 May 1949 and ended on 24 June 1950, with the league played on the basis of two points for a win and one for a draw.

Originally 14 teams were due to contest the league, the same line-up as the league for the abandoned 1947–48 season. However Hapoel HaTzafon Tel Aviv had disbanded and after failing to play their first three matches, the rest of the club's fixtures were cancelled and the league was contested by 13 clubs.

The title was won by Maccabi Tel Aviv. In early March 1950, Maccabi Nes Tziona were ejected from the league after failing to appear at three consecutive matches; all remaining matches in the season were forfeited. The club finished bottom of the league and were relegated.

After a season's hiatus, football resumed in 1951, by which time Liga Alef had become the country's top division.

League table

Results

See also
1949-50 Liga Meuhedet

References
Israel - List of Final Tables RSSSF
 100 Years of Football 1906–2006, Elisha Shohat (Israel), 2006

 

1948–49 in Israeli football
1949–50 in Israeli football leagues
Israel
Liga Alef seasons